Vitthal Shankar Avasthi is an Indian politician from the Bharatiya Janata Party and a member of the Rajasthan Legislative Assembly representing the Bhilwara Vidhan Sabha constituency of Rajasthan.

References 

Bharatiya Janata Party politicians from Rajasthan
People from Bhilwara
Rajasthan MLAs 2018–2023